Drasteria pallescens, the cowhead arches, is a moth of the family Erebidae. The species was first described by Augustus Radcliffe Grote and Coleman Townsend Robinson in 1866. It is found in North America from Alberta and Saskatchewan south to Texas and Baja California.

The wingspan is about 35 mm. Adults are on wing in June in the north. Probably earlier southward.

References

External links

Drasteria
Moths of North America
Moths described in 1866